Greatest Hits: From the Beginning is the title of the first greatest hits compilation issued by American country music singer Travis Tritt. Released in 1995 on Warner Bros. Records, the album features thirteen tracks from Tritt's first four studio albums Country Club (1990), It's All About to Change (1991), T-R-O-U-B-L-E (1992), and Ten Feet Tall and Bulletproof (1994). Two songs were newly recorded for this album as well: the Steve Earle-penned "Sometimes She Forgets", and a rendition of the pop standard "Only You (And You Alone)". The former was released as a single in 1995, reaching #7 on the Hot Country Songs charts, while the latter reached #51 on the same chart. Overall, the album was certified platinum by the RIAA for sales of one million copies.

Track listing

Personnel
Sam Bacco - percussion, timpani
Richard Bennett - electric guitar
Mike Briganrdello - bass guitar
Pat Buchanan - electric guitar, slide guitar
Larry Byrom - acoustic guitar, slide guitar
John Cowan - background vocals
Wendell Cox - electric guitar
Terry Crisp - steel guitar
Jerry Douglas - dobro
Stuart Duncan - fiddle
Paul Franklin - steel guitar
Jack Holder - electric guitar
John Jorgenson - electric guitar
Bernie Leadon - electric guitar
Billy Livsey - harmonium, Hammond organ
Dennis Locorriere - background vocals
Phil Madeira - Hammond organ
Mac McAnally - acoustic guitar
Dana McVicker - background vocals
Edgar Meyer - arco bass
Mark O'Connor - fiddle
Bobby Ogdin - harpsichord, piano
Hargus "Pig" Robbins - piano
Mike Rojas - piano
Matt Rollings - piano
Jimmy Joe Ruggiere - harmonica
Russell Smith - background vocals
Marty Stuart - electric guitar and vocals on "The Whiskey Ain't Workin'"
Travis Tritt - lead vocals
Steve Turner - drums
Billy Joe Walker Jr. - electric guitar
Kent Wells - electric guitar
Reggie Young - electric guitar

Charts

Weekly charts

Year-end charts

References

1995 greatest hits albums
Travis Tritt albums
Warner Records compilation albums